Entertainers...On and Off the Record is the eighteenth studio album by American country music group The Statler Brothers. It was released in 1978 via Mercury Records. The album peaked at number 5 on the Billboard Top Country Albums chart.

Track listing
"Do You Know You Are My Sunshine" (Don Reid, Harold Reid) – 2:13
"Yours Love" (Harlan Howard) – 3:08
"The Best That I Can Do" (D. Reid) – 2:51
"You're the First" (Lew DeWitt) – 2:13
"Tomorrow Is Your Friend" (D. Reid) – 2:33
"The Official Historian on Shirley Jean Berrell" (D. Reid, H. Reid) – 2:16
"Who Am I to Say" (Kim Reid) – 2:06
"I Forgot More Than You'll Ever Know" (Cecil A. Null) – 3:11
"When You Are Sixty-Five" (D. Reid) – 2:38
"I Dreamed About You" (D. Reid) – 2:40
"Before the Magic Turns to Memory" (D. Reid) - 3:11

Chart performance

References

1978 albums
The Statler Brothers albums
Mercury Records albums
Albums produced by Jerry Kennedy